Gordon A. "Sparkie" Sparkes (born c. 1945) is a Canadian curler from Winnipeg, Manitoba. He curled competitively from 1964 until 1979.

Awards
Manitoba Curling Hall of Fame: 2014 (with all 1979 Canadian Men's Championship Team skipped by Barry Fry)

Teams

References

External links
 
 Gordon Sparkes Gallery | The Trading Card Database
 
 Gordon Sparkes – Curling Canada Stats Archive

Living people
Canadian male curlers
Brier champions
1940s births
Curlers from Winnipeg